Broadwater County is a county in the U.S. state of Montana. As of the 2020 census, the population was 6,774. Its county seat is Townsend. The county was named for Charles Arthur Broadwater, a noted Montana railroad, real estate, and banking magnate.

History

The Lewis and Clark Expedition traveled through what is now Broadwater County as they traced the Missouri River. Gold was discovered in the Big Belt Mountains in 1864 which brought several mining towns. In 1881 the Northern Pacific Railway included a stop in what is now Townsend.

Geography

The boundaries of the county are roughly formed by the Big Belt Mountains to the east and north, the Elkhorn Mountains to the west, and the Horseshoe Hills to the south.

Broadwater County is perhaps best known as the home of Canyon Ferry Lake, the third largest body of water in Montana. The lake provides essential irrigation to local farms, and serves as a recreation destination for the region, with fishing, boating, swimming, camping, and wildlife viewing opportunities.

Major highways

  Interstate 90
  U.S. Highway 12
  U.S. Highway 287
  Montana Highway 2

Adjacent counties

 Meagher County - east
 Gallatin County - south
 Jefferson County - west
 Lewis and Clark County - northwest

National protected area
 Helena National Forest (part)

Politics

Demographics

2000 census
As of the 2000 United States census, there were 4,385 people, 1,752 households, and 1,270 families living in the county. The population density was 4 people per square mile (1/km2). There were 2,002 housing units at an average density of 2 per square mile (1/km2). The racial makeup of the county was 97.04% White, 0.27% Black or African American, 1.16% Native American, 0.11% Asian, 0.07% Pacific Islander, 0.34% from other races, and 1.00% from two or more races. 1.32% of the population were Hispanic or Latino of any race. 25.5% were of German, 14.5% English, 12.9% Irish, 9.9% Norwegian and 6.3% French ancestry. 98.0% spoke English and 1.3% German as their first language.

There were 1,752 households, out of which 30.10% had children under the age of 18 living with them, 61.40% were married couples living together, 6.90% had a female householder with no husband present, and 27.50% were non-families. 24.10% of all households were made up of individuals, and 9.90% had someone living alone who was 65 years of age or older. The average household size was 2.47 and the average family size was 2.91.

The county population contained 25.20% under the age of 18, 4.80% from 18 to 24, 26.20% from 25 to 44, 27.40% from 45 to 64, and 16.40% who were 65 years of age or older. The median age was 41 years. For every 100 females there were 104.00 males. For every 100 females age 18 and over, there were 103.70 males.

The median income for a household in the county was $32,689, and the median income for a family was $36,524. Males had a median income of $28,495 versus $19,500 for females. The per capita income for the county was $16,237. About 7.60% of families and 10.80% of the population were below the poverty line, including 13.70% of those under age 18 and 7.90% of those age 65 or over.

2010 census
As of the 2010 United States census, there were 5,612 people, 2,347 households, and 1,614 families living in the county. The racial makeup of the county was 96.2% white, 1.3% American Indian, 0.3% black or African American, 0.2% Pacific islander, 0.2% Asian, 0.3% from other races, and 1.5% from two or more races. Those of Hispanic or Latino origin made up 2.2% of the population. In terms of ancestry, 38.7% were German, 16.2% were English, 15.5% were Irish, 7.9% were Norwegian, 6.4% were Scottish, and 2.3% were American.

Of the 2,347 households, 27.5% had children under the age of 18 living with them, 58.7% were married couples living together, 6.2% had a female householder with no husband present, 31.2% were non-families, and 26.6% of all households were made up of individuals. The average household size was 2.37 and the average family size was 2.85. The median age was 45.4 years.

The median income for a household in the county was $44,667 and the median income for a family was $46,949. Males had a median income of $34,500 versus $32,014 for females. The per capita income for the county was $19,606. About 5.8% of families and 10.1% of the population were below the poverty line, including 10.0% of those under age 18 and 7.1% of those age 65 or over.

Economy
Agriculture is one of the primary industries in Broadwater County. RY Timber and Wheat Montana Bakery were the largest private employers according to the 2000 Census.

Communities

City
 Townsend (county seat)

Census-designated places

 Radersburg
 Spokane Creek
 The Silos
 Toston
 Wheatland
 Winston

Unincorporated communities

 Canton
 Copper City
 Diamond City
 Eustis
 Holker
 Lombard

Former communities
 Lombard

See also
 USS Broadwater (APA-139)
 List of lakes in Broadwater County, Montana
 List of mountains in Broadwater County, Montana
 National Register of Historic Places listings in Broadwater County MT
 Yorks Islands

References

External links
 TownsendValley.com

 
Montana counties on the Missouri River
1897 establishments in Montana
Populated places established in 1897